Dawid Sarkisow (born 20 November 1982) is a Turkmen footballer currently playing for Aşgabat FK. He has also been capped by the national team 16 times. Sarkisow is an ethnic Armenian.

Club career
From summer 2015 player of FC Ashgabat.

International career
Sarkisow has played for Turkmenistan 16 times, playing in the 2012 AFC Challenge Cup and FIFA World Cup qualifying matches.

Honors
AFC Challenge Cup:
Runners-up: 2012

References

External links
 

1982 births
Living people
Ethnic Armenian sportspeople
Turkmenistan footballers
Turkmenistan international footballers
Association football defenders
Turkmenistan people of Armenian descent
FC Aşgabat players